Cheadle may refer to:
Cheadle, Alberta, Canada
Cheadle, Greater Manchester, England
Cheadle (UK Parliament constituency), a constituency composed of the town and environs of Cheadle, Greater Manchester, England
Cheadle, Staffordshire, England
Cheadle Yorkshire, a fictional character in the manga series Hunter × Hunter

People with the surname
Alfred S. Cheadle (1853–1923), Australian wool broker
Ashley Cheadle (born 1987), Australian surfer, model and actress
Don Cheadle (born 1964), American actor
Edwin K. Cheadle (c. 1895–1981), Justice of the Montana Supreme Court
Frank Cheadle (1885–1916), Australian rugby footballer
Richard Cheadle (born 1950), former Royal Navy officer and Controller of the Navy
Vernon Cheadle (1910–1995), American plant scientist
Walter Butler Cheadle (1836–1910), English paediatrician

See also
Cheadle Heath, part of Stockport, Greater Manchester, England
Cheadle Hulme, part of Stockport, Greater Manchester, England